Thomas Worcester  is an American Jesuit, academic and university administrator. He served on the faculty of College of the Holy Cross and is the 11th President of Regis College, Toronto.

Biography 
Worcester was born and raised in Burlington, Vermont. He received his B.A. from Columbia University in 1977 and received his master's degrees from Harvard Divinity School and Weston School of Theology. He also obtained a Ph.D. from the University of Cambridge. He entered the Society of Jesus in 1983 and was ordained to the priesthood in 1991.

He served on the faculty of the College of the Holy Cross for over two decades before being appointed as President of Regis College, a postgraduate theological college of the University of Toronto in 2017.

Worcester was also appointed Professor of History at the University of Toronto in 2018. His research focuses on the history of the Catholic Church in early modernity, especially the religion and culture of early modern France and Italy.

Under his leadership, Regis College announced the merging of graduate facilities with the University of St. Michael's College, while retaining its separate board of governors and administration.

References 

Living people
Academics from Vermont
College of the Holy Cross faculty
Academic staff of the University of Toronto
Boston College School of Theology and Ministry alumni
Harvard Divinity School alumni
Alumni of the University of Cambridge
American Jesuits
American historians of religion
Historians of France
Historians of Italy
Year of birth missing (living people)